Yad Ben Zvi, also known as the Ben-Zvi Institute, is a research institute and publishing house named for Israeli president Yitzhak Ben-Zvi  in Jerusalem.

History
Yad Ben-Zvi is a research institute established to continue the Zionist, educational and cultural activities of Israel's second and longest serving president, Yizhak Ben–Zvi. It is housed in the home and offices of Ben-Zvi and his wife, Rachel Yanait, in Jerusalem's Rehavia neighborhood.

Ben-Zvi founded the institute in 1947 to explore the history and culture of the Jewish communities living in Arab countries. It houses a library of manuscripts, rare books and a photographic archive, and runs an academic publishing house. In 1956, the Institute began its publication of the Annual, Sefunot, a journal that publishes articles on Jewish communities in the East, from the end of the Middle Ages to the present. In 1979, it began publishing the Quarterly, Pe'amim: Studies in Oriental Jewry. Yad-Ben Zvi organizes courses, seminars, lectures and special tours of Jerusalem.

In 2012, the institute opened a new international school for Jerusalem studies in a renovated historic building formerly known as the Pioneer Women's House.

References

External links
Yad Ben Zvi website

Research institutes in Israel
Research institutes established in 1947